Shaft (stylized as SHAFT; ,), also known as Shaft Animation Studio, is a Japanese animation studio headquartered in Suginami, Tokyo, and founded in 1975. Since 2004, the studio's productions have been broadly influenced by director Akiyuki Shinbo, whose visual style and avant-garde cinematography are featured in works including Hidamari Sketch (2007), Sayonara, Zetsubou-Sensei (2007), the Monogatari series (2009–2019), Puella Magi Madoka Magica (2011), Nisekoi (2014), and March Comes In Like a Lion (2016).

History

1975–1984: Early sub-contracting work
Shaft was founded as a yūgen-gaisha on September 1, 1975, by ex-Mushi Production employee Hiroshi Wakao. Much of the company's early work was sub-contracting work for larger animation studios, which includes credits to cel painting and color coordination work, such as with Brave Raideen (1975–76), and occasionally credits as an assistant production studio for projects including Pierrot's Urusei Yatsura: Only You (1983). A large portion of the company's early painting work was contracted under Sunrise productions, including many directed by Yoshiyuki Tomino who, according to anime producer Seiji Suzuki, had been mentored by Wakao while at Mushi Production.

1984–2004: Move to animation production
In 1984, Shaft was sub-contracted by studio Zuiyo to animate the Elves of the Forest television series, marking the company's first project as a primary animation studio. Not until 1987, however, with the release of the Yume kara, Samenai original video animation (OVA), did the studio release its first wholly-original production. In the same year, the studio produced the first episode of the Taiman Blues: Naoto Shimizu-hen OVA series.

For the next several years, the company returned to sub-contracting work based on animation production services rather than its painting services, such as with the Mushi Production film Ushiro no Shoumen Daare (1991). In 1995, the studio moved to producing full-length series, starting with Juuni Senshi Bakuretsu Eto Ranger. By this time, several directors and animators had joined the studio, such as Toshimasa Suzuki and Kenji Yasuda; however, one of the most important series in the company's early history was an outsourcing contract they took on in 1996: Legend of Crystania: The Chaos Ring, which began the studio's relationship with director Ryūtarō Nakamura and studio Triangle Staff. The second episode of the OVA series was outsourced to Shaft, and both Nakamura and Triangle Staff's president (Yoshimi Asari) visited Shaft while delivering the episode's storyboard. Mitsutoshi Kubota, a studio color designer turned production manager at the time, met with the two, and from then they would collaborate on several more projects together, such as Shaft producing an episode of Nakamura and Triangle Staff's Kino's Journey television series, and Nakamura later directing a television series and Kino's Journey film at the studio.

In 1998, Radix produced a 26-episode adaptation of Kia Asamiya's manga Silent Möbius; and although produced as a Radix production, Shaft was contracted as an outsourcing company for the entire series, and according to Kubota served as the production site for the series (rather than Radix). Shaft was also responsible for selecting the staff, and chief director Hideki Tonokatsu worked from the studio. Nobuyuki Takeuchi left Studio Giants in the early 90s, and Shaft offered him a seat at the studio as a freelancing animator; and for Silent Möbius, he took on the role of "animation director" (not referring to the correction of drawings). Kubota felt that Takeuchi would eventually play a central role in Shaft's works succeeding the series, and he eventually became an integral part of many of the productions made with Shinbo.

Shaft entered co-operations with studios Gainax and TNK around 2000. The first of the productions under these co-operations was Mahoromatic (2001) and its sequel Mahoromatic: Something More Beautiful (2002–03), both with Gainax. 2002 was also the release of the studio's production with TNK, G-On Riders. In 2003 and 2004, the studio produced an adaptation of the visual novel Popotan, and later This Ugly yet Beautiful World, an original series co-produced with Gainax.

2004–2017: Kubota and Team Shinbo era
In 2004, Wakao was succeeded as Shaft's representative director by Kubota, though he remained a chairman on the studio's board. After watching The SoulTaker (2001) and Le Portrait de Petit Cossette (2004), both works directed by Akiyuki Shinbo, Kubota decided that he wanted to work with Shinbo to create a uniquely identifiable brand for the studio. In October 2004, the studio animated its first production with Shinbo as director, Tsukuyomi: Moon Phase, and he began serving as an executive director and mentor to the studio's staff.

Shaft's final co-production with Gainax came in 2005 with He Is My Master. The same year saw the first animated production under the influence of "Team Shinbo", a director trio consisting of Shinbo, Shin Oonuma, and Tatsuya Oishi, who played a vital role in the studio's early stylistic decisions. Shinbo had invited both Oonuma and Oishi to direct episodes under him having seen their work under him on previous projects outside of Shaft. The next two years also saw the release of the REC (2006) and Kino's Journey: Country of Illness -For You- (2007), the aforementioned series directed by Ryūtarō Nakamura, which would be the last series produced by Shaft not to feature any involvement by Shinbo for more than a decade.

During the mid-to-late 2000s, the studio brought on a number of new directors and creators, including Ryouki Kamitsubo, Naoyuki Tatsuwa, Kenichi Ishikura, Yukihiro Miyamoto, Shinichi Omata, Tomoyuki Itamura, and Gekidan Inu Curry. Kamitsubo and Oonuma, however, left by the end of the decade, with the latter joining Silver Link where he established a similar role to Shinbo's.

In 2009, Shinbo and Oishi directed Bakemonogatari, which was later characterized as a hallmark of the studio's unique aesthetics. It gained a cult-like following among fans in both Japan and the West for its narrative and "visually striking" animation and artistic qualities. Polygon named it as the series that "pushed studio Shaft into the spotlight", and the series was chosen as the "best anime series of 2009" by the Tokyo Anime Award Festival in 2017. Following Bakemonogatari, the studio produced yet another critical and financial hit two years later with Puella Magi Madoka Magica. Madoka Magica is regarded by several publications and critics as one of the greatest anime productions of all time, and the series' financial and critical success spawned a franchise consisting of several films, television series, and games produced in part or in whole by Shaft. Along with the Monogatari series, Madoka Magica is considered to be one of the most financially successful anime products in Japan, with both series maintaining the highest average sales of DVDs, Blu-Rays, and re-releases in Japan. In 2012, the studio returned to animating the Monogatari series with Nisemonogatari, albeit with director Tomoyuki Itamura in place of Oishi. Itamura and Shinbo produced a subsequent Monogatari season every year up until Zoku Owarimonogatari (2018), which is the only Monogatari season to feature Shinbo as the sole director.

The early-to-mid 2010s brought more changes to the studio's creative staff and the studio itself. For one, 2015 was the year Shaft reorganized from a yūgen-gaisha to a kabushiki-gaisha. Several directors also ended up leaving around this time, such as Kenichi Ishikura after serving as assistant director on Mahō Sensei Negima! Anime Final in 2011, Shinichi Omata around 2012, and Naoyuki Tatsuwa after he directed Gourmet Girl Graffiti in 2015. A number of other notable directors were brought into the studio around this time, however, such as directors Yuki Yase, Kenjirou Okada, Hajime Ootani, and Midori Yoshizawa. Tatsuya Oishi disappeared from the public spotlight in the early 2010s after he began production on the Kizumonogatari film trilogy, which was released in 2016 and 2017. Shaft's animation work on the trilogy has been praised as being uniquely experimental with 2D and CG effects, which some reviewers described as not always mixing well, but has nonetheless been called "gorgeous."

In the late 2010s, a number of other creative staff left the studio. Yuki Yase left after directing The Beheading Cycle: The Blue Savant and the Nonsense Bearer (2016–17), taking production generalizer Kousuke Matsunaga with him to work on Fire Force at David Production; Tomoyuki Itamura, who had directed the rest of the Monogatari series after Oishi's commitment to Kizumonogatari, left after the production of Owarimonogatari II (2017); Izumi Takizawa, a veteran color designer with the studio since Pani Poni Dash!, followed Itamura.

2017–present: Post-Team Shinbo

In 2017, directors Kenjirou Okada and Nobuyuki Takeuchi directed their debuts as series/film directors with March Comes In like a Lion (2016–18) and Fireworks (2017), but the following year experienced a hiatus from the animation industry. The film version of Zoku Owarimonogatari was the studio's only original, non-continuing release that year, and its televised release was the studio's only main project the following year. The studio was, however, outsourced to for an episode of Tezuka Productions' adaptation of The Quintessential Quintuplets (2019). The entirety of the episode was produced at Shaft, with Midori Yoshizawa as episode director and a majority of the Shaft production team working on the episode, including the studio's colorists, animators, and photographers (the episode is also the only episode to feature a separate photography director, that being Shaft's Rei Egami). TBS producer Junichirou Tanaka stated that he had met CEO Kubota at a dinner party once and had asked on his knees for Shaft's help in producing the first half of the series' 11th episode, but during conversation Kubota noted that he knew of the issues with the production and decided that Shaft would be capable of producing the entire episode. Series director Satoshi Kuwabara drew the episode's storyboards but left the production of the episode entirely up to Yoshizawa and Shaft.

In 2020, Shaft returned to producing full-length series with Magia Record: Puella Magi Madoka Magica Side Story, an adaptation of a spin-off mobile game series based on the studio's Madoka Magica franchise. It was the first series since 2007 not to be directed in part by Akiyuki Shinbo (although he served as an animation supervisor), and was instead directed by Doroinu of Gekidan Inu Curry, one of the original series' alternate space designers. Shaft's second and final project of the year, Assault Lily Bouquet, was also the first time since 2007 that Shinbo had not been involved with one of the studio's main projects entirely. Bouquet was instead directed by former Gainax member Shouji Saeki and Shaft member Hajime Ootani.

Shinbo returned to the director's chair in 2021 with his adaptation of Pretty Boy Detective Club, which he co-directed alongside Ootani. The series served as the debut for Shaft's CGI animation division, as well as the Umegumi division. The second season of Magia record: Puella Magi Madoka Magica Side Story later that year also debuted the company's background art division, albeit listed under Digital@Shaft, before being given their own department name in the third season of the series in early 2022. Later that year, the company opened a branch studio in Shizuoka (which is also the first animation studio in Shizuoka Prefecture), with a few of the staff members from the head office moving to the city in order to establish operations and train new staff. Veteran color designer Yasuko Watanabe, who joined the company in 2000, became the branch studio's chief.

Style

Visual style
Directors Akiyuki Shinbo, Shin Oonuma, and Tatsuya Oishi, who formed "Team Shinbo", are essentially responsible for defining Shaft's production culture and experimental stylistic visuals in the mid-to-late 2000s. They each brought separate stylistic strengths that contributed to the eventual "Shaft style" the studio embraced, despite the fact that neither Oonuma nor Oishi had much prior experience as directors. Oonuma and Oishi's success with the studio is in part due to the "mentorship" system created at Shaft, which was centered around Shinbo. The two former directors would work under Shinbo and the Shaft system as episode directors and storyboard artists until they were promoted to series directors with Shinbo maintaining a supervising role over them. In turn, they, too, could begin mentoring other directors; in particular, Oonuma mentored Yukihiro Miyamoto, Tomoyuki Itamura, and Naoyuki Tatsuwa, and Oishi's influence has been exerted across the Shaft studio as a whole (and most likely Itamura, who took over the Monogatari series from Oishi). Team Shinbo, Miyamoto, and Itamura's styles within Shaft as a whole tend to be more experimental in nature, whereas Tatsuwa was the sole director who took a more grounded approach to the series he was involved with (while still maintaining Shaft's style).

Several techniques that the studio's directors still employ were popularized by Team Shinbo, such as the usage of ostentatious or simple backgrounds and tones, unique editing cuts, flat color contrasts, the insertion of real-world objects into the animated medium, monochromatic color schemes, minimalistic and abstract backgrounds, extreme changes in background art, and sharp color contrasts. which are used to facilitate certain surrealistic narratives and imagery, but despite this, consistently exist through each of the studio's productions. Miyamoto brought to the studio sharp color contrasts and changing color palettes, which Itamura was stylistically influenced by; Itamura himself also created his own style defined by the usage of "chapter breaks" and paper cutouts. Tatsuwa, in contrast to the others, maintained series with less visual surrealism, albeit he continued to use several of the stylistic elements from the other directors. One of the studio's most well-known stylistic insertions, the so-called head-tilt, has also been acknowledged by Shinbo as one of the studio's staples.

Miyamoto brought to Shaft the art troupe Gekidan Inu Curry in 2008 during (Zoku) Sayonara, Zetsubou-Sense, and the duo's style greatly influenced the studio's animation style as a whole, which later defined the Madoka Magica franchise that Miyamoto and Shinbo directed two years later.

Narrative style
Shaft's work culture has also influenced the narrative writings of the studio's productions, which have been described as existing "somewhere between comedy and despair", which can be best seen through the works of director Miyamoto, who has headed some of the studio's most depressive series, and also their most comedic. The studio's works oftentimes also include unconventional characters and experimentation within the genre of the series the studio produces, while also diverging from the expectations of the audience.

Production style
Following Wakao's retirement in 2004, Kubota decided to restructure the studio's system itself. While the arrival of Shinbo, Oonuma, and Oishi was a part of this restructuring, Kubota also founded Shaft's in-house photography, painting, and visual effects division, which would move the already-existing painting team, in 2004. The division, named Digital@Shaft, made its first appearance on Gakuen Alice episode 4, which was outsourced to Shaft. In August 2020, Shaft posted a recruitment notice for 3DCG animation staff, and the Shaft CGI Animation Room (a division spun-off from Digital@Shaft) debuted in the studio's Pretty Boy Detective Club series the following year. The same series also debuted Shaft Umegumi, a division presumably headed by director Yasuomi Umetsu, who directed the series opening title animation. In 2021, Digital@Shaft formed a background art team as well. Kubota has also emphasized a particular focus on putting full studio effort into each of their works, and not increasing the number of productions purely to satiate demand.

Shaft visual effects chief Hisato Shima stated that other studios commonly have animators and operators specializing in 3D (or certain aspects of the 3D process), but that Shaft artists tend to work in a more broad area and perform several tasks during anime production. Shaft's production pipeline often utilizes materials created during the normal production pipine (that is: layouts, key animation, in-between animation, finishing (painting/coloring), photography, editing) that work as temporary reference points for both 2D and 3D animators, and assist with camera angles, reference points, and other processes. Later in the production, these temporary materials are removed, and the final CG work is added. In order to counteract the issues that come with productions that have a mix of traditional/CG animation in regards to paper and digital canvas sizes, the studio developed a format that would be convenient for both processes by standardizing a 2156 x 1526 pixel screen size for the 3D artists.

Beyond the in-house culture the studio emphasizes in its works, Shaft has also emphasized using a common workflow from project to project to ease the transition from production to production. The purpose of such commonality between productions is to allow for consistency and the continuity of Shaft's style between productions. While this system allows for Shaft's style to manifest throughout each of their productions, it also allows for more creative freedoms across all individuals working with the studio, such as Shinbo's philosophy of "mix[ing] participating staffer’s feelings". Madoka Magica screenwriter Gen Urobuchi described the work environment as giving him a level of freedom he'd never had before, and that "I did not think I could have written this screenplay in any other place", and both original character designer Ume Aoki and alternate space designers Gekidan Inu Curry have expressed similar perspectives. Although anime is a collaborative process, the signature style of Shaft can best be attributed to the whole of the studio and its members rather than a single individual, and the artistic freedoms across the entire production line allow for the convergence of different staff members and their ideas to freely explore the medium which they work in.

According to both Kubota and Shinbo, Shaft's productions as a whole also desire the involvement of the original authors or creators of the source material which they adapt in their productions.

Shaft is also one of the only studios that manages an in-house online shop Shaft Ten which sells Blu-Rays, production materials, and other merchandise for series the company owns the rights to.

Productions

Anime television series

Anime films

Original video animations

Original net animations

Other productions

See also
Mushi Production—founder Hiroshi Wakao and several other staff members were part of Mushi Production prior to Shaft's foundation
Gainax—worked closely with Shaft in the early-to-mid 2000s; Gainax director Shouji Saeki currently works exclusively with Shaft
Millepensee—founded by ex-Shaft production manager Naoko Shiraishi
Diomedéa—studio currently represented by ex-Shaft animator Makoto Kohara
Silver Link—ex-Shaft director Shin Oonuma works with Silver Link in a similar position to Shinbo's at Shaft
David Production—ex-Shaft CG director Shinya Takano and production managers Reo Honjouya and Kousuke Matsunaga joined David Production around 2018

Notes

Production notes

Credit notes

Works cited

References

External links 

 

 
Japanese companies established in 1975
Animation studios in Tokyo
Mass media companies established in 1975
Japanese animation studios
Suginami
Nisio Isin